Roger Beaufrand (25 September 1908 – 14 March 2007) was the world's oldest Olympic gold medal winner, following the death of Pakistani Field Hockey player Feroze Khan in 2005 until his own death.

Born near Paris, France, Beaufrand won a gold medal on 7 August at the 1928 Summer Olympics in the field of Olympic sprint at the age of 19. A few weeks prior to his death, he was presented the Chevalier class of the Legion of Honor by fellow Olympic Champion Jean-Claude Killy.

References

1908 births
2007 deaths
Cyclists at the 1928 Summer Olympics
French male cyclists
Olympic cyclists of France
Olympic gold medalists for France
Chevaliers of the Légion d'honneur
Olympic medalists in cycling
People from La Garenne-Colombes
Medalists at the 1928 Summer Olympics
French track cyclists
Sportspeople from Hauts-de-Seine
Cyclists from Île-de-France